"Stronger" is the lead single by singer-songwriter Mandisa from her third album What If We Were Real.

Composition
"Stronger" is originally in the key of A♭ Major, with a tempo of 174 beats per minute. Written in common time, Mandisa's vocal range spans from Eb3 to Eb5 during the song.

Live performances
Mandisa performed the song on Good Morning America.

Commercial performance
"Stronger" peaked at No. 1 on the Hot Christian Songs chart, becoming her first song to do so. As of August 31, 2011 the song has sold 194,000 copies.

Music video
A lyric video for the single "Stronger" was released on February 24, 2015.

Charts

Weekly charts

Year-end charts

Certifications

References 

2011 singles
Mandisa songs
Songs written by Ben Glover
2011 songs
Sparrow Records singles
Songs written by Christopher Stevens (musician)